Cecilia Mangini (31 July 1927 – 21 January 2021) was an Italian film director, considered the first female documentary filmmaker in Italy.

In 1958, her first documentary was released, titled Ignoti alla Città (Unknown to the City). Written by Pier Paolo Pasolini, the film focused on adolescents in Rome's suburbs after World War II.

Mangini died on 21 January 2021 in Rome.

Personal life
Born in 1927 in Mola di Bari, Italy, Mangini moved with her family to Florence at age six, when her father's leather business failed. She then moved to Rome in 1952 and worked in a film club federation, where she met and eventually married Lino Del Fra, with whom she collaborated on several film projects.

Filmography

Director 
 Ignoti alla città (1958)
 Maria e i giorni (1959)
 Firenze di Pratolini (1959)
 La canta delle marane (1960)
 Stendalì - Suonano ancora, (1960)
 La passione del grano, co-directed with Lino Del Fra (1960)
 Fata Morgana, co-directed with Lino del Fra (1961)
 All'armi, siam fascisti!, co-directed with Lino del Fra and Lino Micciché (1962)
 La statua di Stalin, co-directed with Lino del Fra (1963)
 Divino amore (1963)
 Trieste del mio cuore (1964)
 Pugili a Brugherio (1965)
 Felice Natale (1965)
 Essere donne (1965)
 Brindisi '65 (1966)
 Tommaso (1967)
 Domani vincerò (1969)
 La briglia sul collo (1974)
 Due scatole dimenticate – un viaggio in Vietnam, co-directed with Paolo Pisanelli (2020)

Screenwriter 
 Firenze di Pratolini (1959)
 Stendalì - Suonano ancora (1960)
 All'armi, siam fascisti!, directed by Lino Del Fra, Cecilia Mangini and Lino Micciché (1962)
 La torta in cielo, directed by Lino Del Fra (1970)
 Black Holiday, directed by Marco Leto (1973)
 Antonio Gramsci: The Days of Prison, directed by Lino Del Fra (1977)
 Klon, directed by Lino Del Fra (1994)
 Regina Coeli, directed by Nico D'Alessandria (2000)
 In viaggio con Cecilia, directed by Mariangela Barbanente and Cecilia Mangini (2013)

References

Sources

Further reading

External links
 
 

1927 births
2021 deaths
Italian documentary film directors
Italian women film directors
Italian women screenwriters
Italian communists
20th-century Italian screenwriters
20th-century Italian women writers
21st-century Italian screenwriters
21st-century Italian women writers
People from the Province of Bari